University of Gloucester may refer to:
University of Gloucestershire, Gloucester, England
University of Gloucester, fictional university in England